This is a list of palaces and manor houses in Latvia built after the 16th century. Palaces and manors which are now part of the Zemgale region were then part of the Selonia region, and therefore are differentiated for clarity. This list does not include castles, which are listed in a separate article. And as there are more than 1000 manor houses and palaces in Latvia, this list is incomplete.

Courland

Semigallia

Selonia

Vidzeme

Latgale

See also
List of castles in Latvia
List of castles
List of castles in Estonia
List of palaces and manor houses in Estonia
List of palaces and manor houses in Lithuania
List of castles in Lithuania

References

Sources

Kurland Property Records

Palaces and manor houses
Palaces and manor houses
Latvia